The premier of Victoria is the head of government in the Australian state of Victoria. The premier is appointed by the governor of Victoria, and is the leader of the political party able to secure a majority in the Victorian Legislative Assembly.

Responsible government came to the colony of Victoria in 1855. Between 1856 and 1892, the head of the government was commonly called the premier or the prime minister, but neither title had any legal basis. The head of government always held another portfolio, usually Chief Secretary or Treasurer, for which they were paid a salary. The first head of government to hold the title of premier without holding another portfolio was William Shiels in 1892.

Premiers of Victoria who have served for more than 3,000 days have a statue installed at Treasury Place. Four Victorian premiers have been afforded this honour: Albert Dunstan, Henry Bolte, Rupert Hamer and John Cain Junior.

Every Premier of Victoria since 1933 (with the exception of Ian MacFarlan, who was Premier for 51 days) has a portrait of them displayed at Queens Hall in Parliament House. The idea of creating a portrait gallery for former Premiers of Victoria was initiated by the Hon. Fred Grimwade, the President of the Victorian Legislative Council from 1979-1985. Prior to 2001, the portraits were originally displayed in the corridor leading to the Members Dining Room, leading to the corridor being known as the "Premiers’ Corridor".
  
The incumbent premier of Victoria since the 2014 election is Daniel Andrews of the Australian Labor Party.

List of premiers of Victoria
Political parties

Timeline

See also
 Department of Premier and Cabinet, Victoria
 Deputy Premier of Victoria
 List of premiers of Victoria by time in office

References

External links

 ABC News – Premiers of Victoria

Victoria, Premier

Premiers
Ministers of the Victoria (Australia) state government